Thomas Jefferson Foster (July 11, 1809 – February 24, 1887) was a soldier and prominent politician serving the Confederate States of America during the American Civil War. He served two terms in the Confederate Congress and was later elected to the United States Congress, but was denied his seat.

Biography
Foster was born in Nashville, Tennessee, the son of a prominent state politician, Robert C. Foster, who had been president of the state senate. At the age of 24, Foster married Virginia Watkins, daughter of a wealthy plantation owner in Lawrence County, Alabama. The couple moved to Courtland, Alabama, where Foster amassed a fortune from his own successful farming endeavors.

With his state's secession, Foster raised the 27th Alabama, an infantry regiment in the Confederate army, and served as its first colonel. He was instrumental in urging the construction of Fort Henry to defend the vital Tennessee River, serving in the fort under General Lloyd Tilghman until its forces surrendered to Ulysses S. Grant.

He then represented Alabama as a representative in the First Confederate Congress and the Second Confederate Congress, where he became known as a "graceful orator and skillful debater." He served on the Committee on Territories and Public Lands and the Committee on Accounts.

In 1865 he was elected to the United States House of Representatives, but as a result of the policies of the Radical Republicans and Reconstruction, former Confederates such as Foster were denied their congressional seats.

References

Political Graveyard biography

Notes

1809 births
1887 deaths
Members of the Confederate House of Representatives from Alabama
19th-century American politicians
Confederate States Army officers
People from Lawrence County, Alabama